Ryan Ingraham (born 2 November 1993) is a Bahamian high jumper.

He participated in the high jump at the 2010 Summer Youth Olympics, finishing first in the B final (ninth overall). At the 2012 World Junior Championships in Athletics in Barcelona, he won a bronze medal.

Personal bests

Competition record

References

External links

Tilastopaja biography

1993 births
Living people
Bahamian male high jumpers
Athletes (track and field) at the 2010 Summer Youth Olympics
Athletes (track and field) at the 2014 Commonwealth Games
Commonwealth Games competitors for the Bahamas
Athletes (track and field) at the 2015 Pan American Games
Pan American Games competitors for the Bahamas
World Athletics Championships athletes for the Bahamas
Central American and Caribbean Games bronze medalists for the Bahamas
Competitors at the 2014 Central American and Caribbean Games
Central American and Caribbean Games medalists in athletics